The 2006 Malé League is the sixth season of the Malé League.

Final standings

References
 2006 Malé League, First Division at RSSSF

Football leagues in the Maldives
Maldives
Maldives
1